The Women's individual competition at the 2017 World Championships was held on 15 February 2017.

Results
The race was started at 14:30.

References

Women's individual
2017 in Austrian women's sport
Biath